Claire Godwin is a former American rugby union player. She was a member of the  squad that won the inaugural 1991 Women's Rugby World Cup in Wales.

In the 1991 World Cup final, Godwin had conceded a penalty try to England which gave them an early lead. A brace of tries in the second half more than made up for her early offence and gave the United States the much-needed boost.

Godwin and the 1991 World Cup squad were inducted into the United States Rugby Hall of Fame in 2017.

References 

Year of birth missing (living people)
Living people
Female rugby union players
American female rugby union players
United States women's international rugby union players